Coleophora leucochares is a moth of the family Coleophoridae. It is found in north-eastern India (Assam, Shillong).

References

leucochares
Moths of Asia
Fauna of Assam
Moths described in 1922